Santhoor Subramanya Temple is a Hindu temple located in the village of Santhoor near Padubidri, Karnataka. Here Kartikeya is worshipped as Subramanya, lord of all serpents. The main festivals celebrated here includes Shashti, Kiru Shashti and Nagara Panchami. During the Shashti Mahotsav Devotees in thousands come into the temple, early in the morning for having Darshan of God, offered special poojas and sought the blessing from God Subramanya for good health, wealth, prosperity and peace.

References

Hindu pilgrimage sites in India
Hindu temples in Dakshina Kannada district
Murugan temples in Karnataka
History of Karnataka
Culture of Karnataka
Hindu temples in Mangalore
Tourist attractions in Mangalore